Temminck's stint (Calidris temminckii) is a small wader. This bird's common name and Latin binomial commemorate the Dutch naturalist Coenraad Jacob Temminck. The genus name is from Ancient Greek kalidris or skalidris, a term used by Aristotle for some grey-coloured waterside birds.

Temminck's stint is one of the species to which the Agreement on the Conservation of African-Eurasian Migratory Waterbirds (AEWA) applies.

Description
These birds are very small waders, at  length. They are similar in size to the little stint (Calidris minuta) but shorter legged and longer winged. The legs are yellow and the outer tail feathers white, in contrast to little stint's dark legs and grey outer tail feathers.

This is a rather drab wader, with mainly plain brown upperparts and head, and underparts white apart from a darker breast. The breeding adult has some brighter rufous mantle feathers to relieve the generally undistinguished appearance. In winter plumage, the general appearance recalls a tiny version of common sandpiper.

The call is a loud trill.

Breeding
This stint's breeding habitat is bogs and marshes in the taiga of Arctic northern Europe and Asia. It will breed in southern Scandinavia and occasionally Scotland. It has a distinctive hovering display flight. It nests in a scrape on the ground, laying 3–4 eggs. Temminck's stint is strongly migratory, wintering at freshwater sites in tropical Africa, the Indian Subcontinent and parts of Southeast Asia.

Temminck's stints have an intriguing breeding and parental care system in which males and female parents incubate separate clutches, typically in different locations. Males establish small territories and mate with a female who lays a first clutch of eggs. She then moves to a second territory and mate, and lays a second clutch that she incubates herself. Concurrently, her first male may mate with an incoming second female, who lays her second clutch on his territory. The male thereafter incubates his first mate's first clutch alone.

An apparent hybrid between this species and the little stint has been reported from the Netherlands.

Feeding
These birds forage in soft mud with some vegetation, mainly picking up food by sight. They have a distinctive mouse-like feeding behaviour, creeping steadily along the edges of pools. They mostly eat insects and other small invertebrates. They are not as gregarious as other Calidris waders, and rarely form large flocks.

Gallery

References

Further reading

Identification

External links

 
 
 
 
 
 
 

Temminck's stint
Temminck's stint
Birds of Russia
Birds of Scandinavia
Temminck's stint
Temminck's stint